Karate Kid (Val Armorr) is a superhero appearing in the DC Comics universe, primarily as a member of the Legion of Super-Heroes. He is a master of every form of martial arts to have been developed by the 31st century. The extent of his skill is so great that he can severely damage various types of hard material with a single blow and was briefly able to hold his own against Superboy through use of what he called "Super Karate".

Publication history
Karate Kid first appeared in Adventure Comics #346 (July 1966) and was created by Jim Shooter. The character appeared in Shooter's first published story, along with other new members of the Legion of Super-Heroes: Princess Projectra, Ferro Lad and Nemesis Kid.

Fictional character biography
Val Armorr was the son of one of Japan's greatest crime lords, Kirau Nezumi, also known as Black Dragon. When he was born, his mother, the American secret agent Valentina Armorr, tried to hide him from his father, but she failed and was killed for her effort. Japan's greatest hero Sensei Toshiaki (the White Crane) eventually killed Black Dragon for his crimes and adopted the infant Val. He raised Val as if he were his own son, and trained him in all manner of the martial arts. Val became the youngest warrior ever to earn the title Samurai, and he went to work for his local shogun. However, after trying his best and failing to please his supervisor, he quit and searched the galaxy for new forms of battle to master.

Legion of Super-Heroes

When Val returned to Earth, he found that the Legion of Super-Heroes was searching for new recruits to battle the Khunds. He applied, and, although he had no superhuman powers, was accepted when he challenged Superboy to single combat and so impressed the Boy of Steel with his unexpectedly formidable skill that Superboy vouched for his admission to the Legion. His Legion career almost ended ignominiously when fellow recruit Nemesis Kid framed him for betraying Earth to the Khunds, but Nemesis Kid's own treachery was discovered in time, and Val went on to become one of the greatest Legionnaires ever. As Karate Kid, Val was the Legion's leader for one term and once took on the entire Fatal Five single-handedly, clearly defeating the Persuader, Emerald Empress, and Mano (though Mano was largely a matter of luck as the Kid admitted to himself). At one point or another he launched solo flying kicks at villains whose power level far exceeded Superboy, including Validus, Mordru, Omega and even Darkseid. Though they had little effect, they showed the degree of his fearless courage. Karate Kid's best friends in the Legion were Timber Wolf, Chamelon Boy, Dawnstar and Ferro Lad. Timber Wolf's acrobatic abilities made him a natural sparring partner against Val and Karate Kid had a calming effect on Brin Londo with his discipline.

Val fell in love with Princess Projectra, who joined the Legion at the same time he did. To prove his worthiness of the princess' hand, he took a leave of absence and spent about a year in the primitive 20th century (during his visit there, Karate Kid was featured in an eponymous, short-lived comic book series: Karate Kid #1 debuted in March 1976 and lasted for 15 issues). He returned to find Projectra's father dead. With Val's and the other Legionnaires' help, she won the throne from her cousin Pharoxx. Val officially became Projectra's consort soon afterward and resigned from the Legion.

Wedded bliss did not last long. He and Projectra returned from their honeymoon to find that her planet, Orando, had been taken over by the Legion of Super-Villains. Val, Projectra, and several other Legionnaires were captured by the villains. When the heroes escaped to oppose the villains, Val fought their leader, Nemesis Kid. Nemesis Kid beat Val almost to death, and Val wanted to continue to fight so that he could die in battle — the ultimate honor by his cultural standards. But at Projectra's urging, Val instead used his remaining strength to destroy the power source for the machines that were moving Orando into a strange dimension. In revenge, Projectra killed Nemesis Kid soon afterward. A memorial to Val was built on Shanghalla.

Myg of Lythyl, one of that planet's Three Judges, later applied for Legion membership and dedicated himself to carrying on the name of "Karate Kid". Like his predecessor, he possessed superior martial arts skills. He became a member of the second Legion of Substitute Heroes while training in the Legion Academy. Myg later joined the Legion during the "Five Year Gap", the gap in-between Legion books before he resigned.

During the "Five Years Later" storyline following the Magic Wars, Earth fell under the covert control of the Dominators, and withdrew from the United Planets. A few years later, the members of the Dominators' highly classified "Batch SW6" escaped captivity. Originally, Batch SW6 appeared to be a group of teenage Legionnaire clones, created from samples apparently taken just prior to Ferro Lad's death at the hands of the Sun-Eater. Later, they were revealed to be time-paradox duplicates, every bit as legitimate as their older counterparts. This version of Val Armorr was killed in battle (along with SW6's Princess Projectra and Chameleon Boy) fighting Dominion troops. Myg, however, resurfaced as one of the many people mindwiped by the Dominators. They unlocked his meta-gene, giving him sonic abilities.

In his 2007 return in Justice League of America, Starman (Starboy) refers to Val having previously died without elaborating on how he returned from death.

1994 reboot

In 1994, the Legion of Super-Heroes was restarted with a new history. In this version, Karate Kid was very much alive and had dedicated his life to mastering as many different forms of fighting as he can. To this end, he joined Leland McCauley's Workforce as Karate Kid to have the opportunity to travel to different planets and learn new disciplines, despite the knowledge that McCauley's values were far different from his own. He was able to live with those differences until McCauley attempted to profit from an anomaly in space which, to Val, represented something purely beautiful, like divine creation. Unable to reconcile his employment with his conscience any longer, he destroyed McCauley's anomaly-tapping machine and fled, and McCauley's men chased him, almost killing him. He asked for the Legion's protection, and they provided it, and, in a deal they worked out with McCauley, McCauley renounced any claim against Val, and Karate Kid became a Legionnaire.

After the Legion disbanded, Val chose to study the Haplashar pacifists on the planet Steeple. What he did not foresee, however, was that this world would be cut off from the rest of the galaxy for ten years because of black hole activity. As they were preparing to leave, Steeple came under attack by Nadir. Ferro took a critical blow from Nadir and Val was forced to choose to stay on Steeple to tend to Ferro's health. They missed the window and were stranded on Steeple.

When Brainiac 5 finally found a moment, he set about trying to establish a stargate to retrieve Val and Ferro from Steeple. This plan succeeded and they were rescued by Shikari and Sensor amidst the Legion's battle with Universo, and helped turn the tide. Afterwards, Val escorted Universo to Steeple, where the Halpashar agreed to watch over the villain (now forced into a sort of "mental coma").

After this Legion's timeline was destroyed in the Teen Titans/Legion Special they remained in limbo until retrieved to fight alongside the original Legion and the Threeboot Legion in Final Crisis: Legion of 3 Worlds. There, Val Armorr met and fought alongside the Threeboot Karate Kid. Afterwards, the post-Zero Hour Legion, under the guidance of Shikari Lonestar, takes the name "the Wanderers" and decides to travel the Multiverse to look for survivors from the various alternate universes that were destroyed.

2005 reboot

In 2005, Legion history was again erased and restarted. In this version, Val Armorr was initially depicted with more Asian features, although he now appears to have predominantly Caucasian features. Still a master of many varied disciplines of martial arts, he is the Legion's most skilled fighter. Although initially drawn to Shadow Lass, who possesses a similar warrior spirit, after he and Tasmia broke up, he harbored a one-sided infatuation with Phantom Girl. Karate Kid is slowly teaching the headstrong Ultra Boy how to focus his powers, and in fact regularly teaches all core Legion members self-defense techniques. He and Light Lass became close after spending the night with one another.

On Velmar V, the Ikonns overtook the planet's rulers, the Peril Men. When the S.P.s intervened, the Young Heroes were captured and the Legion attempted a rescue. While there, Karate Kid and Triplicate Girl were recruited for a strange mission by visitors from another time. Karate Kid and Triplicate Girl left with these strangers, with Val leaving behind a sign reading "OKKK". How he returned to the team is unknown, but Val was shown back with the Legion for the Final Crisis: Legion of 3 Worlds miniseries, where he met the post-Zero Hour Karate Kid.

One Year Later and Countdown
 
In Justice League of America vol. 2, #7, the villain known as Trident was revealed to really be Val Armorr from the pre-Crisis Legion. In issue #8, he battles Black Lightning and Batman while deep in the Batcave. During the fight, Superman's files are shown listing Val as a Class 15 fighter and Batman as a Class 12. Val is stopped when blasted by Black Lightning while Batman distracts him.

Karate Kid and Starman are two of seven Legionnaires currently in the present. This Karate Kid bears little resemblance to the one currently featured in the 2005 reboot, in both physical features and costume, instead closely resembling the pre-Crisis version of the character. Starman (the adult Star Boy) mentions that Val once died, which is consistent with the character's pre-Crisis history.

When being interrogated by Batman, Karate Kid, still disoriented, identifies himself as "Wes Holloway, a member of the Trident Guild". The name is a direct allusion to the protagonist of Brad Meltzer's latest novel, The Book of Fate. He is teased within the narrative of Countdown about his heroic identity being inspired by the Karate Kid film.

When other Legionnaires, except for Starman, return to their own time, Val remains behind in the 21st century. In Countdown #38, he and Triplicate Girl, now known as "Una", visit Barbara Gordon, where it revealed that Val is dying. They are sent to see a Mr. Orr, who declares that he has the answers they seek.

Upon arriving at Orr's compound, Karate Kid briefly battles Equus, until Orr arrives on the scene, and tells them that Karate Kid's illness is similar to the OMAC virus. Under the order of Desaad, a lackey of Darkseid, Orr tells them to visit Buddy Blank in Colorado. Equus and a misunderstanding with the cops and Supergirl delays the trip. Val then meets Buddy Blank and his grandson, who take them to see Brother Eye. The entity scans Val, informing him that he is infected by the "Morticoccus" virus, and directs the group to what was once Blüdhaven. Brother Eye had detected a similar strain there. In Blüdhaven, the group encounters the Atomic Knights and Firestorm. When Val's sickness reaches breaking point, Brother Eye frees itself, and travels to Blüdhaven, turning it into its new base, and uses the Atomic Knights and Firestorm as power sources. He's later brought on Apokolips, as Brother Eye intended to assimilate the Morticoccus during Apokolips' assimilation. As the attempts fail, Brother Eye is forced to assimilate Una instead, having her carry Val inside himself for vivisection. As Brother Eye is defeated, both Val and Una are freed, but Val is now grievously wounded, with Una pleading for his life as the other assembled heroes consider the idea of killing him before the virus spreads. When the group arrives on another of the 52 Earths, Val is taken to Project Cadmus and dies as Dubbilex examines him. During the autopsy, the Morticoccus is released, and spreads its infection into the air. Because of assimilating Val's 31st-century blood, it is practically immune to any form of treatment.

The bodies of Val and Una are eventually discovered by the Gotham City Police Department on New Earth, and Superman and the visiting Lightning Lad mourn their death. It is later revealed that their bodies were planted there by the Time Trapper.

Val Armorr returned to the realm of the living again in the 2010 Legion of Super-Heroes series. He was last seen back with his wife Jeckie on their way to help the Legion against the Fatal Five.

2019 reboot
The latest version of Karate Kid is yet again a martial arts master and a member of the Legion of Super-Heroes.

Solo series

The pre-Crisis on Infinite Earths Karate Kid was featured in a 15-issue ongoing series, cover dated March/April 1976 through July/August 1978. It was written primarily by Barry Jameson and Bob Rozakis, with pencils by Ric Estrada and Juan Ortiz.

As the series begins, Karate Kid begins a long sojourn in the past on 20th century Earth, to prove to King Voxv of Orando that he is worthy of Princess Projectra's hand in marriage. While in the past, he meets and befriends schoolteacher Iris Jacobs, and encounters teen heroes Superboy and Robin. He battles numerous villains, including Nemesis Kid, Major Disaster and the Lord of Time. Eventually, he returns to the 30th century, just in time to assist his fellow Legionnaires during the "Earthwar".

It is not certain which events from this series have been incorporated into post-Infinite Crisis continuity. However, since most of the 21st century heroes were unfamiliar with Karate Kid in "The Lightning Saga" story arc and the Countdown to Final Crisis limited series, it is quite possible that none of the events from the Karate Kid series are canonical at this time.

Powers and abilities
A "living weapon", Karate Kid is considered the greatest martial artist of all time. Karate Kid is the master of every documented form of martial arts to have been developed up to the 31st century. He possesses the ability to sense the weakest spot in objects and people and his skill in hand-to-hand combat is seemingly superhuman, allowing him to simulate super-strength blows. He can severely damage extremely hard and strong materials — metals, stone, etc. — with a single blow. Karate Kid is also a master with all forms of melee weapons (he was the youngest warrior ever to earn the title samurai), though he dislikes using them and rarely needs to employ them. He occasionally fights Supergirl, though he is regularly beaten by her. This is presumably due to her training by the Amazons of Themyscira to learn  to better control her super powers. As Val is male, he is denied Amazon training, making it one of the few skills he has not completely mastered. He fights Supergirl in an attempt to pick up some of those skills secondhand.

Karate Kid's training included mental discipline which makes him more resistant to mind control, as well as giving him a limited control of his body's functions. This allows him to shut out and ignore physical pain; in one story, he nearly died due to this training when he unconsciously shut out the pain of a knife wound and only collapsed hours later, unaware of the injury and almost dying from it.

Equipment
As a member of the Legion of Super-Heroes he is provided a Legion Flight Ring. It allows him to fly and protects him from the vacuum of space and other dangerous environments. Karate Kid combines his skills with his Legion Flight Ring, mastering his own style of aerial combat.

Karate Kid kept an extensive collection of weapons in his Legion quarters, including many bladed weapons, which he was also skilled in using (Legion by-laws did not allow members who relied solely on weapons of any kind, but his were excepted as it was only a private collection). The Kid seldom used weapons when facing his opponents, but he once defeated a super-powered android designed to negate his hand-to-hand skills by using an improvised bō (staff).

In other media

Television

 Karate Kid appeared in the Legion of Super Heroes episode "The Karate Kid", voiced by Keith Ferguson. Despite defeating Superman in one-on-one battle, his lack of superpowers meant he was initially given menial chores around the ship and later kicked out of the Legion for trying to take down Grimbor without back-up. He was later reinstated after defeating Grimbor while the other Legionnaires were temporarily de-powered.
 Val is mentioned in The CW series Supergirl by Querl "Brainy" Dox / Brainiac 5 as a friend of his back in the 31st century and a fellow member of the Legion of Superheroes.

Film
 DC Comics granted Columbia Pictures permission to use the "Karate Kid" name for a series of films starring Ralph Macchio and Pat Morita. However, these films did not depict the comic's character. The credits of the film contain a "thank you to DC Comics" for allowing the use of the name.
 Karate Kid appears as the main character in the animated film JLA Adventures: Trapped in Time, voiced by Dante Basco. This version has the extrasensory ability to see stress points, fracture planes, or weaknesses in his right eye and pupil in objects as well as ki-based attacks in addition to his fighting skills.

References

External links
 A Hero History of Karate Kid
 Karate Kid vs... Gallery

DC Comics titles
DC Comics martial artists
Comics characters introduced in 1966
1976 comics debuts
Fictional Japanese people
Fictional karateka
Fictional samurai
Characters created by Jim Shooter
Superheroes who are adopted